Khanna is a city and a municipal council in the Ludhiana district of the Indian state of Punjab. It is well known for being Asia's largest grain market. It is a city which centers a national highway and buildings settled around a web of roads descending from National Highway to various State Highways to different Directions. It has a huge market place which attracts customers from all around the area, namely Guru Amardas Market.

Toponymy 
Khanna is a Punjabi word, which means one quarter (1/4 or 0.25). The city was named thus because it used to be very small, just a quarter of what a normal city should be.

History 
Khanna has the largest grain market in Asia, followed by the grain market of Rajpura (Punjab). History reveals that Sher Shah Suri built a number of sarais (inns) at every 12 to 15 miles along the Delhi-Lahore road. One of the sarais was built in this area which is still known as the Purani Sarai. After the decline of Mughal rule in the Punjab, Banda Bahadur captured the area from Sirhind to Hoshiarpur. After that a Jathedar of Dahedu controlled and occupied the whole of the area from Dahedu to Nabha. He married his daughter, Daya Kaur, to the King of Nabha. When a family dispute arose between the King and his new wife, she left Nabha for good and went back to live with her parents in Dahedu. According to Indian conventions she could not remain there forever. Therefore, her father gave her a "kann", or a "small portion", of the territory between Dahedu and Nabha that was well known for its agriculture. Over time, the pronunciation of the name changed from "Kann" to "Khanna".

The city is 40 km from the city of Ludhiana on the Grand Trunk Road (National Highway 1) and is home to Asia's largest grain market. Its area is about 70 km2. Villages nearby include Baghaur(Aujla),Kauri, Payal, Ikolahi, Rahoun, Issru, Harion Kalan , Aloona Miana, Bulepur, Rasulra, Ghutind, Bhattian, Libra, Ratan Heri, Bahumajra, Salana, Ramgarh, Salaudi singha and Mohanpur.

Demographics 
As per provisional data of 2011 census Khanna had a population of 128,130, out of which males were 67,811 and females were 60,319. The literacy rate was 84.43 per cent.

Education 
Khanna has following institutes/schools/colleges:
A.S Senior Secondary School Khanna
A S College Khanna 
 Shri Sarswati Sanskrit College Khanna, affiliated to Panjab University, Chandigarh
A. S. Women College, affiliated to Panjab University Chandigarh
Gulzar Group of Institutes (GGI)
IGNOU Regional Centre, Khanna
Radha Vatika Women college
Sanjeevni Nursing College
Rimt University
Delhi Public School Khanna
Khanna public School,Lalheri
A.S. Group of Institutions, Khanna

Transport
Khanna railway station is situated on Ambala–Attari line under Ambala railway division of Northern Railway zone.

Gallery

Notable people
 Bhagat Puran Singh, social worker
 Karan Aujla, singer, lyricist
 Jassi Gill, singer
 Sardool Sikander, singer
 Dilpreet Dhillon, singer
 Narinder Batth, lyricist

See also
Rauni

References 

Cities and towns in Ludhiana district
Punjab